The Laurentian Mountains (French: Laurentides) are a mountain range in southern Quebec, Canada, north of the St. Lawrence River and Ottawa River, rising to a highest point of  at Mont Raoul Blanchard, northeast of Quebec City in the Laurentides Wildlife Reserve. The Gatineau, L'Assomption, Lièvre, Montmorency, Nord and St. Maurice rivers rise in lakes in this mountain range.

Background
Although Laurentides is one of Quebec's official regions, the mountain range of the same name runs through six other regions: Capitale-Nationale, Outaouais, Lanaudière, Mauricie, Saguenay-Lac-Saint-Jean and Côte-Nord. Extending into central Ontario, the foothills of the Laurentian range are known as the Opeongo Hills, or the Madawaska Highlands.

The Laurentian Mountain range is one of the oldest mountain ranges in the world. It contains rocks deposited before the Cambrian Period 540 million years ago. The Laurentians are the central part of the Grenville orogeny dating back to around a billion years.

See also
 Laurentian Upland

References

Mountain ranges of Quebec
Mountain ranges of Canada
Summits of Laurentides
Laurentides Wildlife Reserve